Norefjorden is a lake in the municipality of Nore og Uvdal in Viken county, Norway. Norefjorden is a long, narrow mountain lake which is known for its fishing. Numedalslågen flows into the far north and exits travelling southward  to Kravikfjorden.  Norefjord bridge goes across the lake between Norefjord and Gvåle. The surrounding terrain is steep and forested.

See also
List of lakes in Norway

References

Lakes of Viken (county)